In taxonomy, "Marinosulfonomonas" is a genus.

References

Further reading

Scientific journals

Scientific books

Scientific databases

External links

Alphaproteobacteria
Bacteria genera